Till Death, La Familia is the seventh studio album, released by American heavy metal band Ill Niño. The album was released on July 22, 2014, through Victory Records.
This is the last Ill Niño album to feature Cristian Machado on vocals, Ahrue Luster on lead guitar, Diego Verduzco on rhythm guitar, and the only Ill Nino album to feature Oscar Santiago on percussion.

Track listing
All songs written and composed by Ill Niño

Personnel
 Cristian Machado - vocals
 Ahrue Luster - lead guitar, engineering
 Diego Verduzco - rhythm guitar
 Lazaro Pina - bass, engineering
 Dave Chavarri - drums, co-production
 Oscar Santiago - percussion

Chart performance
The album debuted at No 143 on the Billboard 200.

References

2014 albums
Ill Niño albums
Victory Records albums
Albums produced by Eddie Wohl